Lehan is a surname. Notable people with the surname include:

Adam Lehan, British guitarist
James Lehan (1856–1946), American baseball player
Michael Lehan (born 1979), American football player

See also
Behan
Lohan